Abbs Cross Academy and Arts College (once known as Abbs Cross Technical High School) is situated on Abbs Cross Lane, Hornchurch, in the London Borough of Havering, England.  Abbs Cross Academy and Arts College is an Arts College. The school has a strong link with Havering Sixth Form College in which a majority of its students go on to attend.  The School's Headteacher is Mrs Nicola Jethwa, who took on the role of Acting Headteacher but later became the Headteacher.  Abbs Cross school was opened in 1958 as a mixed Technical High School, and was enlarged in 1973.
Abbs Cross Academy and Arts College joined the "Loxford School Trust" on Tuesday 2 February 2016.

Arts 
The school has been awarded an Artsmark from the Arts Council England. Auditions are held for students who wish to enter the school as Performing Arts students.

Abbs Cross Music Department has a Dance Band that played for Queen Elizabeth II at Romford Market, and Tony Blair at the Guildhall in London. It has also taken part in Heritage Concerts at the Queen's Theatre, Hornchurch for the Mayor of Havering and, was a Dome Performer for the Year 2000 celebrations at the Millennium Dome, Greenwich. The Dance Band have also toured throughout Europe.
The school held a Jubilee Anniversary party in September 2008 (50th Anniversary).
In October 2008, the school's dance company (AX Dance Company) performed at the Olympic festival in Romford, in which the Olympic torch passed through to celebrate the forthcoming 2012 Olympic Games.

Loxford 
Loxford School of Science and Technology took control of the leadership Abbs Cross in February 2016. This was due to the struggles the school had faced during the years of 2012 to 2015 after a long-term headteacher retired. An Ofsted inspected in June 2015 discovered that the school was no longer graded "good" it was now a grade "inadequate" and put into special measures thenceforth.

Abbs Cross under the support of the Loxford School Trust decided to put an application in 2016 to open a sixth form however this application was rejected as the school did not reach the necessary requirements to do so, and many more changes have been put in place to try to have the school removed from special measures so the school can have a sixth form in future and regain its status.

Recently, the school was removed from special measures and is now rated ‘good.’ Furthermore, it has put in a second application for a sixth form. This application was also rejected.

Notable former pupils
 Daniel Huttlestone, Actor
 Jesy Nelson, British singer, former member of Little Mix
 Stacey Solomon, Reality TV star and presenter 
Richard Wisker, Actor and Presenter (CBBC)
 Terry Edwards, Musician

Abbs Cross Technical High School

 Robert Edmiston, billionaire who founded Christian Vision
 John Fassenfelt OBE, Chairman from 2011 to 2013 of the Magistrates' Association
 John Flack (politician), Conservative MEP from 2017 to 2019 for the East of England
 Alex Jennings, actor who played Prince Charles in the 2006 The Queen
 Bob Neill, Conservative MP since June 2006 for Bromley and Chislehurst
 David Sullivan (businessman), founder of the Sunday Sport (newspaper)

References

External links 
 
  at Ofsted
 Abbs Cross Academy & Arts College Government Page

Academies in the London Borough of Havering
Educational institutions established in 1958
Secondary schools in the London Borough of Havering
1958 establishments in England
Hornchurch